The Egypt national roller hockey team is the national team of Egypt for international roller hockey. It is usually part of the FIRS Roller Hockey World Cup.

Egypt squad 

Team Staff
 General Manager:
 Mechanic:

Coaching Staff
 Head Coach:
 Assistant:

Titles

References

External links
Website of Egypt Roller Hockey

National Roller Hockey Team
Roller hockey
National roller hockey (quad) teams